Le jour se lève ("The day rises"; also known as Daybreak) is a 1939 French film directed by Marcel Carné and written by Jacques Prévert, based on a story by Jacques Viot. It is considered one of the principal examples of the French film movement known as poetic realism.

In 1952, it was included in the first Sight & Sound top ten greatest films list.

Synopsis
Foundry worker François (Jean Gabin) shoots and kills Valentin (Jules Berry). François then locks himself in his apartment. He is soon besieged by the police, who fail in an attempt to shoot their way into the room. As they regroup to decide how to apprehend him, François begins to reminisce on how he came to be in this predicament.

Several months earlier, he had begun to date Françoise (Jacqueline Laurent), a florist's assistant. They bonded over the similarities in their names and the fact that they both were orphans. François fell in love with her and hoped to marry her, but she turned him down in order to have a relationship with the older Valentin, a narcissistic, manipulative dog trainer. Embittered, François began a relationship with Clara (Arletty), Valentin's former assistant in his dog show. Over the next few weeks, Clara fell in love with François, but he preferred to have only a casual relationship with her; she knew it was because he had continued to see Françoise, with whom he was still in love. One day, Valentin told François that he was in fact Françoise's father; she was the product of a youthful dalliance. Later that afternoon, François asked Françoise if Valentin was telling the truth. She denied it, saying that Valentin habitually made up stories. But she also confessed that she was falling in love with François and wanted to be with him.

Valentin confronted François in his apartment. He admitted to having lied about being Françoise's father and brandished a gun with which he had intended to shoot François. Instead, he taunted François with allusions to his sexual encounters with Françoise. Enraged, François picked up the gun and shot Valentin.

Alone in his room and out of cigarettes, François realizes he has no hope of escape.  He does not know that Françoise, delirious with guilt, is now being tended to by Clara. The police decide to throw tear gas into François's room in an attempt to subdue him. But just before they do, François commits suicide by shooting himself in the heart.

Cast
 Jean Gabin as François
 Jacqueline Laurent as Françoise
 Jules Berry as Valentin
 Arletty as Clara
 Arthur Devère as Gerbois
 Bernard Blier as Gaston
 Marcel Pérès as Paulo
 Germaine Lix as singer
 Georges Douking as blind man (uncredited)

Distribution
Le jour se lève was released in France in June 1939 and shown in the US the following year. In France, however, the film was banned in 1940 by the Vichy government on the grounds it was demoralizing. After the war's end, the film was shown again to wide acclaim.

In 1947, it was again suppressed when RKO Radio Pictures wanted to remake the film in Hollywood (as The Long Night). The company acquired the distribution rights of the French film and sought to buy up and destroy every copy of the film that they could obtain.  For a time it was feared that they had been successful and that the film was lost, but it re-appeared in the 1950s and has subsequently stood alongside Les Enfants du paradis as one of the finest achievements of the partnership of Carné and Prévert.

Home media
In 2014, a restored version of the film was released as a region-B Blu-ray disc by Studio Canal. This version reinstates dialogue and shots (including a nude Arletty) that had been deleted by Vichy censors.

See also
List of rediscovered films

References

External links
 
 Le jour se leve at the TCM Movie Database

1939 films
1939 crime drama films
1939 romantic drama films
French crime drama films
French romantic drama films
French black-and-white films
Films directed by Marcel Carné
Films with screenplays by Jacques Prévert
1930s rediscovered films
Rediscovered French films
1930s French-language films
1930s French films